

Number 1650 was the sole example of a unique seaplane design produced for the flying service of the Imperial German Navy during the First World War. From 1916 onwards, the Kaiserliche Werften produced a range of training seaplanes for the Navy, in order to free the nation's major seaplane manufacturers to produce front-line types. During the closing stages of the war, however, the Kaiserliche Werft Danzig and Kaiserliche Werft Wilhelmshaven produced a small number of front-line types as well, including this machine. Number 1650 was an armed reconnaissance seaplane equipped with radio equipment capable of transmission and reception, therefore gaining the naval CHFT classification.

Specifications

Notes

References
 

 
 

1910s German military reconnaissance aircraft
1650
Floatplanes
Single-engined tractor aircraft
Biplanes